The Criminal Investigation Department (CID; Sinhala: අපරාධ විමර්ෂණ දෙපාර්තමේන්තුව Aparadha Vimarshana Departmentuwa, Tamil: குற்றவியல் விசாரணை திணைக்களம்) is the primary investigative arm of the Sri Lanka Police and was established in 1870. It is headed by a director, who was of a Senior Superintendent of Police (SSP) Grade. However, since the late 1970s, the position of Deputy Inspector General of Police - CID (DIG/CID) was established.

Role 
The CID handles cases of a very serious nature that require specialist skills and complex detection. While the Terrorism Investigation Division (TID)  has taken over most counter-terrorist investigations in the police when directed by Inspector General of Police or the Secretary of Defence to investigate a specific incidence the CID takes over the investigation from the relevant jurisdictional Police Station and cooperates with other intelligence agencies in the investigation.

References

External links 
 Official Police Website

Sri Lanka Police units
Criminology organizations
Criminal investigation